This is a list of all the Ultra prominent peaks (with topographic prominence greater than 1,500 metres) in the Himalayas. Listed separately, to the west and north-west are the Karakoram and Hindu Kush Ultras, and while to the north-east and east are the ultras of Tibet.9 of the 10 Himalayan 8,000m peaks are ultras (the exception is Lhotse), and there are a further 28 peaks over 7000m.

Kashmir/Punjab - Between Indus and Sutlej Rivers

Garhwal&Kumaon- Sutlej to Kali Rivers

Western Nepal/Tibet: Sharda River to Kali Gandaki River 

The Kali Gandaki River is normally considered to mark the divide between the Western and Eastern Himalayas.

Central Nepal/Tibet: Kali Gandaki River to Arun River

Arun River to Bhutan border

Bhutan to the Brahmaputra (Assam Himalaya)

References

Sources
Western list
Eastern list
Map

Eastern Himalayan Ultras
Himalayas
Himalayas